The 1980 Congoleum Classic was a men's tennis tournament played on outdoor hard courts. It was the 7th edition of the Indian Wells Masters and was part of the 1980 Volvo Grand Prix. It was played at the Mission Hills Country Club in Rancho Mirage, California in the United States and began on February 11, 1980.

Events

Men's singles

The tournament was halted at the semifinal stage due to rain. The four semifinalists were Jimmy Connors, Brian Teacher, Peter Fleming and Gene Mayer and they shared the Finalists prize.

Men's doubles

Cancelled due to rain.

References

External links
 Official tournament website
 Indian Wells Tennis Garden

 
Congoleum Classic
Indian Wells Masters
Congoleum Classic
Cong
Congoleum Classic